Fremont Township is one of twenty townships in Benton County, Iowa, USA. At the 2000 census, its population was 1,736.

Geography
According to the United States Census Bureau, Fremont Township covers an area of 36.23 square miles (93.85 square kilometers).

Cities, towns, villages
 Atkins

Adjacent townships
 Canton Township (north)
 Fayette Township, Linn County (northeast)
 Clinton Township, Linn County (east)
 Fairfax Township, Linn County (southeast)
 Florence Township (south)
 St. Clair Township (southwest)
 Eldorado Township (west)
 Eden Township (northwest)

Cemeteries
The township contains these three cemeteries: Fix, Raetz and Saint Stephens.

Major highways
  U.S. Route 30

School districts
 Benton Community School District
 Vinton-Shellsburg Community School District

Political districts
 Iowa's 3rd congressional district
 State House District 39
 State Senate District 20

References
 United States Census Bureau 2007 TIGER/Line Shapefiles
 United States Board on Geographic Names (GNIS)
 United States National Atlas

External links

 
US-Counties.com
City-Data.com

Townships in Benton County, Iowa
Cedar Rapids, Iowa metropolitan area
Townships in Iowa